A keyer is a device for signaling by hand, by way of pressing one or more switches. Modern keyers typically have a large number of switches but not as many as a full-size keyboard; typically between four and fifty. A keyer differs from a keyboard in the sense that it lacks a traditional "board"; the keys are arranged in a cluster which is often held in the hand. An example of a very simple keyer is a single telegraph key which used for keying Morse code. In such a use, the term "to key" typically means to turn on and off a carrier wave. For example, it is said that one "keys the transmitter" by interrupting some stage of the amplification of a transmitter with a telegraph key.

Morse code was an early form of serial communication, which in modern times is usually automated. In a completely automated teleprinter system, the sender presses keys to send a character data stream to a receiver, and computation alleviates the need for timing to be done by the human operator. In this way, much higher typing speeds are possible.

Iambic key became popular in telegraphy during the 1960s. In these, the "dot" and the "dash" are separate keys.  When this concept was introduced to inventor Steve Mann in the 1970s, he mistakenly heard "iambic" as "biambic" which he then generalized to include various "polyambic" or "multiambic" keyers, such as a "pentambic" keyer (five keys, one for each finger and the thumb), and "septambic" (four finger and three thumb buttons on a handgrip). These systems were developed primarily for use in early, experimental forms of wearable computing, and have also been adapted to cycling with a heads-up display in projects like BEHEMOTH by Steven K. Roberts. Mann (who primarily works in computational photography) later utilized the concept in a portable backpack-based computer and imaging system, WearCam, which he invented for photographic light vectoring.

Such keyers, often used in conjunction with wearable computers, are typically one-handed grips. Unlike keyboards, the wearable keyer has no board upon which the switches are mounted. Additionally, by providing some other function – such as simultaneous grip of flash light and keying – the keyer is effectively hands-free, in the sense that one would still be holding the light source anyway.

Chorded or chording keyboards have also been developed, and are intended to be used while seated having multiple keys mounted to a board rather than a portable grip. One type of these, the so-called half-QWERTY layout, uses only minimal chording, requiring the space bar to be pressed down if the alternate hand is used. It is otherwise a standard QWERTY keyboard of full size. It, and many other innovations in keyboard controls, were designed to deal with hand disabilities in particular.

References

External links
Summary of keyers, commercially made keyers, other links, etc. (archived version)
 GKOS back-panel chording keyboard, an open standard for handheld devices
 Twiddler 2 one-handed chording keyboard/mouse
 Data Egg one-handed chording keyboard for handheld devices
Yet another one-hand keyboard — Do-it-yourself, wearable, one-hand keyboard prototypes
Wearable keyer suitable for QRP use (leg mount accessory)
Intelligent Image Processing (See Appendix on keyers)
How to make your own custom-molded perfect-fit keyer
Spiff chorder (keyer for daily wearable computer use)

Computer keyboard types